Challenge of the Five Realms: Spellbound in the World of Nhagardia is a role-playing video game created by MicroProse for MS-DOS and published in 1992.

Tommo purchased the rights to this game and digitally publishes it through its Retroism brand in 2015.

Plot
The Prince of Castle Ballytogue awakens after being hit on the head to learn that his father, King Clesodor of Alonia, has been killed by an evil sorcerer named Grimnoth. As the prince seeks to avenge his father's death and defeat Grimnoth, he explores the five realms, numerous cities, and visits many people with only 100 game days within which to complete his tasks.

Reception
The game was reviewed in 1993 in Dragon #196 by Hartley, Patricia, and Kirk Lesser in "The Role of Computers" column. The reviewers gave the game 3 out of 5 stars. Computer Gaming World stated that "though, at times, Challenge rates highly on the esteemed fun-o-meter, there are still several elements of game design where Challenge is lacking", criticizing the apparent lack of "an adequate beta testing program—there are simply too many oversights with a certain awkwardness to gameplay that shouldn't exist in a final version".

Reviews
PC Player (Germany) - May, 1993

References

External links
Challenge of the Five Realms at MobyGames
Walkthrough at GameFAQs

1992 video games
Classic Mac OS games
DOS games
Games commercially released with DOSBox
Linux games
MicroProse games
Role-playing video games
Single-player video games
Tommo games
Video games developed in the United States
Windows games